The Fifty-eighth Oklahoma Legislature was a meeting of the legislative branch of the government of Oklahoma, composed of the Senate and the House of Representatives. It met in Oklahoma City, Oklahoma from January 3, 2021, to January 3, 2023, during the second two years of the first administration of Governor Kevin Stitt. The 2020 Oklahoma elections maintained Republican control of both the House and Senate.

Dates of sessions
Organizational day: January 5, 2021
First Session: February 1, 2021 - May 28, 2021
2021 Redistricting Special Session: November 15, 2021 - November 19, 2021
Second Session: February 7, 2022 – May 27, 2022
2022 Concurrent Special Session: May 18, 2022 - May 27, 2022
2022 Governor's Special Session: June 13, 2022 -
Previous: 57th Legislature • Next: 59th Legislature

Major Legislation

First Session

Abortion
HB 1102- This bill adds abortion to the list of "unprofessional conduct" for doctors.
HB 2441- This bill bans abortion once a fetal heartbeat is detected.
HB 1904- This bill requires abortions to be performed by a board certified OB-GYN.
SB 918- This bill would automatically make abortion illegal in Oklahoma if either Roe v. Wade (1973) is overturned or  if an amendment to the United States Constitution restoring the State's authority to prohibit abortions is passed.

Civil Service reform
HB 1146- This bill, called the Civil Service and Human Capital Modernization Act, creates a new internal state agency in charge of arbitrating and settling state employee complaints. This agency would have the power to contract administrative law judges to oversee these cases. The bill eliminates the Oklahoma Merit Protection Commission.

Criminal Justice
SB 631- This bill makes Oklahoma a Second Amendment sanctuary state.
SB 172- This bill, called Ida's law, creates an office in Oklahoma State Bureau of Investigation dedicated to searching for missing and murdered Indigenous people in Oklahoma and directs them to cooperate with the U.S. Department of Justice on this issue.
HB 1674- This bill increases criminal penalties for riots and provides for a legal defense when a driver commits vehicular homicide while fleeing a riot.

Education
HB 1775- This bill bars public schools from teaching various concepts related to Critical Race Theory.
SB 658- This bill prohibits schools, colleges, and universities from requiring vaccination against COVID-19. It also limits their ability to mandate mask wearing to only when there is a state of emergency declared by the Governor of Oklahoma and they have consulted their county health department.

Healthcare
HB 1019- This bill caps the cost of a 30 day supply of insulin at $30 and a 90 day supply at $90.

Religious Freedom
HB 2648- This bill prevents the government from closing religious institutions during emergencies.

Second Session

Abortion 
SB 612- This bill makes it a felony to perform an abortion, except to save the life of the mother.
SB 1503- This bill allows civil lawsuits against those who help a woman get an abortion after about six weeks into her pregnancy. The Oklahoman reported the bill as a "Texas-style abortion law."
HB 4327- This bill allows civil lawsuits against those who help a woman get an abortion at any point during her pregnancy. The woman pursuing the procedure cannot be sued. The bill contains limited exceptions for medical emergencies, rape and incest. The Oklahoman reported the bill as being the "strictest anti-abortion law in the nation." All four abortion providers in the state stated they stopped performing abortions once the law took effect.

Criminal justice 
SB 968- This bill allows police departments to prevent the release of an audio or video recording that includes a police officer's death. A judge can still order the videos release if they find it is in the public's interest.
HB 3316- This bill allows the automatically expungement of certain criminal cases.
SB 1052- This bill directs the Oklahoma Department of Corrections to dedicate $4.89 million to the privately operated Lawton Correctional and Rehabilitation Facility for a per diem increase. It also directs $2.92 million to the privately operated Davis Correctional Facility for the same purpose. The bill was vetoed by Governor Kevin Stitt, but the legislature overrode the veto.

Education
HB 2046- This bill authorizes the creation of higher education districts for two-year colleges to access property tax dollars. The bill was vetoed by Governor Kevin Stitt, but the legislature overrode the veto.

Environmental
HB 4412- This bill creates a soil preservation program within the Oklahoma Conservation Commission. The bill was vetoed by Governor Kevin Stitt, but the legislature overrode the veto.

Government Agency reforms
HB 4457- This bill establishes an Oklahoma Route 66 Commission. The bill was vetoed by Governor Kevin Stitt, but the legislature overrode the veto.
SB 1695- This bill requires the filing of financial disclosure statements for agency directors and cabinet secretaries appointed by the governor. The bill was vetoed by Governor Kevin Stitt, but the legislature overrode the veto.

Subsidies
HB 4455- This bill creates a 3.4% state rebate on qualified capital expenditures with a minimum investment of $3.6 billion and a maximum of $4.5 billion. The rebates also require meeting certain employment minimums and other conditions over five years. Rebates are paid from the Large-scale Economic Activity and Development (LEAD) Fund created by the bill with an initial funding of $698 million. The bill was reported as being nicknamed "Project Ocean" and was intended to attract Panasonic to build an electric vehicle battery factory in Oklahoma. Panasonic later announced it would build its electric vehicle battery factory in Kansas.

Transgender rights
SB 2- This bill prevents transgender girls and women from competing on female sports teams in public, private, and charter schools and college sports.
SB 1100- This bill bars issuing non-binary birth certificates in Oklahoma.

Tribal Relations
HB 3501- This bill allows the Oklahoma Department of Public Safety to revoke driver’s licenses based on traffic offense convictions in tribal courts. The bill was vetoed by Governor Kevin Stitt, but the legislature overrode the veto.

Calls for additional special sessions
On August 2, 2021, the Oklahoma House Democrats released a statement pointing out rising COVID-19 rates in the state and called for a special session of the Oklahoma Legislature in order to repeal SB658. The bill bans local school districts from instating mask mandates unless the Governor of Oklahoma institutes a state of emergency. Governor Kevin Stitt has refused to issue a state of emergency.

Major Events
In January 2021, Mauree Turner (D-Oklahoma City) became the first publicly non-binary U.S. state lawmaker and the first Muslim member of the Oklahoma Legislature.

On May 6, 2021, the Oklahoma Legislature formed its first Latino Caucus. Founding members included Senators Michael Brooks (D-Oklahoma City) and Jessica Garvin (R- Duncan) and Representatives Jose Cruz (D-Oklahoma City) and Ryan Martinez (R-Edmond).

On December 17, 2021, Representative Terry O'Donnell (R-Catoosa) was indicted in a corruption scandal. He did not resign his seat and filed for re-election in the 2022 election.

On January 21, 2022, Representative Jose Cruz (D-Oklahoma City) resigned after accusations of sexual misconduct at a New Year's Eve party.

On February 8, 2022, Representative Kyle Hilbert (R-Bristow), at 27, was elected as the youngest House speaker pro tempore in modern state history.

On February 28, 2022, the legislature formed its first American Irish Caucus. Founding members included Senators Carri Hicks (D-Oklahoma City) and Mary Boren (D-Norman) and Representatives Terry O'Donnell (R-Catoosa) and John Waldron (D-Tulsa).

In May 2022, a bipartisan, 15 member  House Special Investigative Committee was formed to investigate the Oklahoma Tourism and Recreation Department and Swadley's Bar-B-Q. Swadley's Bar-B-Q had contracted with the state to run restaurants in state parks until the contract was cancelled for "suspected fraudulent activity and questionable business practices." The State of Oklahoma paid Swadley's over $16 million dollars while the contract was in effect.

In May 2022,  the Oklahoma Legislature formed its first Asian American and Pacific Islander Caucus. Founding members included Representatives Cyndi Munson (D-Oklahoma City), Andy Fugate (D-Oklahoma City), and Daniel Pae (R-Lawton).

Membership

Changes in membership during session
April 14, 2021 Jake Merrick (R) is sworn in to fill Stephanie Bice's vacant Senate District 22 seat.
January 21, 2022 Jose Cruz (D) resigned from representing HD-89 following a sexual assault scandal, leaving the seat vacant until the next election.

Senate

Overview

Leadership
Senate Leadership

Majority Leadership

Minority Leadership

Committee Leadership

Joint Committee Leadership

Redistricting Committee

Members

†Elected in a special election

House

Overview

Leadership
House Leadership

Majority Leadership

Minority Leadership

Members

References

External links

Oklahoma legislative sessions
2021 in Oklahoma
Oklahoma
2022 in Oklahoma
Oklahoma